"Vent'anni" is a 1970 Italian song composed by Giancarlo Bigazzi, Enrico Polito and Totò Savio and performed by Massimo Ranieri.  The song won the eighth edition  of Canzonissima, beating Gianni Morandi's "Capriccio" and establishing Ranieri as the new favorite of the Italian younger audience. 
 
The song also got an immediate commercial success, with the single ranking #1 on the Italian hit parade.

Track listing

   7" single – N 9823 
 "Vent'anni"  (Giancarlo Bigazzi, Enrico Polito, Totò Savio)
 "Io non avrò" (Giancarlo Bigazzi, Enrico Polito, Totò Savio)

Charts

References

 

1970 singles
Italian songs
1970 songs
Number-one singles in Italy
Songs written by Totò Savio
Compagnia Generale del Disco singles
Songs written by Giancarlo Bigazzi